Steven Conrad (born May 20, 1968) is an American filmmaker.

Personal life
Steven Conrad was born in Fort Lauderdale, Florida, and briefly attended Florida State University before transferring to Northwestern University, where he majored in creative writing. His brother, Chris Conrad, is an actor and has frequently appeared in Steven's productions. Their mother was a teacher at St. Gregory the Great Catholic School, Plantation, Broward County, Florida.

Career
Shortly after attending Northwestern, at age 19, he sold his first screenplay, Wrestling Ernest Hemingway, adapted from a short story he had written for a creative writing class. Eleven years passed before he tackled his next project, Lawrence Melm, which he wrote and directed. He followed this with The Weather Man (which he also produced) and The Pursuit of Happyness. He wrote, directed, and edited The Promotion, which premiered at South by Southwest in March 2008 and was released by Dimension Films later that year. 

His projects include an adaptation of the Chang-Rae Lee novel Aloft for Scott Rudin; Chad Schmidt, about a talented actor with a resemblance to Brad Pitt and The Expanding Mailman with Jack Black.

In 2013, he adapted a James Thurber short story for the film The Secret Life of Walter Mitty, directed by and starring Ben Stiller. In 2015, Conrad developed Patriot for Amazon Studios. Its pilot led to a full series order, and it premiered in its entirety on February 24, 2017. In addition to executive-producing the series, he has also written and directed most of the first season's episodes.

In the same year, Conrad re-wrote the script for Wonder, a film adaptation of the 2012 novel of the same name by R. J. Palacio. The script was also written by Jack Thorne and Stephen Chbosky, with the latter having directed the film, which was released on November 17, 2017.

In 2019, Conrad's series Perpetual Grace, LTD, starring Sir Ben Kingsley and featuring many of the actors from Patriot, premiered on Epix. In 2021, Conrad's stop action animation series Ultra City Smiths premiered on AMC+.

Filmography

Film

Television

Awards

References

External links
 
March 11, 2008 Conrad interview at SXSW

1968 births
American male screenwriters
American directors
American film directors
American film producers
Living people
Conrad, Steven
Northwestern University alumni
Writers from Fort Lauderdale, Florida
Florida State University alumni
Screenwriters from Florida
Film directors from Florida
Film producers from Florida
American television directors
American male television writers
Television producers from Florida
American television producers
American expatriates in England